Ancathia is a genus of flowering plants in the family Asteraceae.

The only known species is Ancathia igniaria, native to Mongolia, Xinjiang, Altay, Kazakhstan, Uzbekistan, and Azerbaijan.

References

External links

Monotypic Asteraceae genera
Flora of temperate Asia
Cynareae